Le Trio en mi bémol is a brief filmed theatrical comedy directed by Éric Rohmer in 1988 starring Pascal Greggory and Jessica Forde. It runs for 75 minutes.

Plot
Paul and Adèle were once lovers and separated but are still good friends, one year after everything seems to take them away from each other. The key of E-flat may be the key of true friendship, but it is Mozart that pushes them apart...

1988 films
Films directed by Éric Rohmer
French comedy films
1980s French films